A misdeal in card games is an error by the dealer which calls for a re-deal and/or a penalty. The rules for a misdeal and penalty vary according to the game. A misdeal is sometimes called by miscounting, or when two cards stick together. Sometimes, when a misdeal is detected, a new hand is dealt. In most games a misdeal, and recall of the cards, does not prevent the same player dealing again.

There are specific misdeal rules in e.g. Pinochle, Spades, and Euchre.

References 

Card game terminology